Salina USD 305, also known as Salina Public Schools, is a public unified school district headquartered in Salina, Kansas, United States.  The district includes the communities of Salina, Trenton, and nearby rural areas.  As of 2018 the district had 7,144 students.

Schools
The school district operates the following schools:

High Schools
 Salina High School Central
 Salina High School South

Middle Schools
 Lakewood Middle School
 South Middle School

Elementary Schools
 Coronado Elementary School
 Cottonwood Elementary School
 Heusner Elementary School
 Meadowlark Ridge Elementary School
 Oakdale Elementary School
 Schilling Elementary School
 Stewart Elementary School
 Sunset Elementary School

Academic achievement
In 2018, 26.87 percent of the students tested had an effective or excellent ability to understand and use the mathematics skills and knowledge needed for college and career readiness. In the same year 32.85 percent of the students tested had an effective or excellent ability to understand and use the English Language arts skills and knowledge needed for college and career readiness.

See also
 List of unified school districts in Kansas
 List of high schools in Kansas
 Kansas State Department of Education
 Kansas State High School Activities Association

References

External links
 

School districts in Kansas
Education in Saline County, Kansas